Karl Jaavuo (born in Townsville, on 11 February 1969) is an Australian-born French former professional rugby league footballer who represented France at the 1995 World Cup.

Playing career
Jaavuo made his debut for France in 1994 against the touring Australian side. In 1995 he played in three matches for France at the World Cup.

He played for the Pia Donkeys in the 2004 Challenge Cup, getting sin-binned in their final match against the Huddersfield Giants.

References

1969 births
Living people
French rugby league players
France national rugby league team players
Baroudeurs de Pia XIII players
Rugby league props
Rugby league players from Townsville
Australian expatriates in France
Naturalized citizens of France
Australian people of Finnish descent
French people of Finnish descent